Kacper Żuk (born 21 January 1999) is a Polish professional tennis player.

Żuk has a career high ATP singles ranking of World No. 162 achieved on 13 September 2021. He also has a career-high ATP doubles ranking of World No. 278, achieved on 9 May 2022.

Żuk has reached ten career singles finals with a record of 11 wins and 3 losses, which includes a 1–2 record in ATP Challenger Tour finals. Additionally, he has reached 21 career doubles finals, with a record of 12 wins and 9 losses all but one occurring at the ITF Futures level.

Tennis career

2020–21: First Challenger title and top 200
Żuk made his ATP debut at the 2020 ATP Cup, where he represented Poland in a singles match, losing to Marin Čilić of team Croatia.

He ended the 2020 season with back-to-back ITF World Tennis Tour titles at Hamburg and Vale do Lobo.

He reached his first Challenger final in March 2021 and in April won his first Challenger title at the 2021 Split Open II in Croatia. As a result, he reached the top 200 on 19 April 2021 and a career-high of No. 162 on 13 September 2021.

2022–23: United Cup debut
He played his first match at the 2023 United Cup as the Polish No. 3 male player in the semifinals against Frances Tiafoe and lost in straight sets.

Grand Slam singles performance timeline

ATP Challenger and ITF Futures Finals

Singles: 14 (11 titles, 3 runner-ups)

Doubles: 21 (12 titles, 10 runner-ups)

Notes

References

External links
 
 

1999 births
Living people
Polish male tennis players
People from Nowy Dwór Mazowiecki